Francis Kennedy (1941 – 21 December 2019) was a Gaelic footballer who played for Cavan Championship club Drumlane and the Cavan county team, with whom he lined out at senior level as a left wing-back.

Honours
Drumlane
Cavan Junior Football Championship (1): 1971

Cavan
Ulster Senior Football Championship (1): 1964
Ulster Minor Football Championship (1): 1959

References

1941 births
2019 deaths
Cavan inter-county Gaelic footballers
Drumlane Gaelic footballers
Gaelic football backs